The Alliance for Transformation for All (ATA) is a South African political party founded in 2018 to lobby for the interests of the taxi industry.

The party is campaigning for subsidies to the minibus taxi industry, and for taxi drivers to self-regulate their industry. The South African National Taxi Council (Santaco) has distanced itself from the party.

ATA contested the 2019 general election, failing to win a seat.

Election results

National elections

|-
! Election
! Total votes
! Share of vote
! Seats 
! +/–
! Government
|-
! 2019
| 14,266
| 0.08%
| 
| –
| 
|}

Provincial elections

! rowspan=2 | Election
! colspan=2 | Eastern Cape
! colspan=2 | Free State
! colspan=2 | Gauteng
! colspan=2 | Kwazulu-Natal
! colspan=2 | Limpopo
! colspan=2 | Mpumalanga
! colspan=2 | North-West
! colspan=2 | Northern Cape
! colspan=2 | Western Cape
|-
! % !! Seats
! % !! Seats
! % !! Seats
! % !! Seats
! % !! Seats
! % !! Seats
! % !! Seats
! % !! Seats
! % !! Seats
|-
! 2019
| 0.27% || 0/63
| 0.04% || 0/30
| 0.03% || 0/73
| 0.07% || 1/80
| - || -
| 0.04% || 0/30
| 0.06% || 0/33
| - || -
| 0.30% || 0/42
|}

References

2018 establishments in South Africa
Political parties established in 2018
Political parties in South Africa